Cosmopterix margaritae is a moth of the family Cosmopterigidae. It is found from the island of Kyushu in Japan and from Taiwan.

The length of the forewings is 3.6–4 mm. Adults have been recorded on wing in July and November.

The larvae feed on Digitalia adscendens and Paspalum conjugatum.

Etymology
The species name refers the pearly metallic ornamentation of the forewings and is derived from Latin margarita (meaning pearl).

References

Moths described in 2011
margaritae